Camiri (Camirito, La Bomba, Choreti, Capital Petrolera de Bolivia) is  a city in Bolivia, Santa Cruz Department, Cordillera Province. It is the seat of the Camiri Municipality. The town has an estimated population of 65,897 inhabitants, also known as "Camireños."  Camiri is on the banks of the Parapeti River in a small valley surrounded by rolling hills on the east, north, and south, and by the Aguarague mountain range on the west.

Camiri's Chaco ecosystem encompasses subtropical dry forests with low canopy, and intense xerophilic overgrowth with a large diversity of wildlife.

On February 3, 2007, local protesters shut down a natural gas pipeline in Camiri that serves southern Bolivia. The protesters were seeking an expansion of the nationalization of the natural gas industry and a renewal of the promise of construction of facilities for YPFB, the national petroleum company.

Climate

Camiri has a humid subtropical climate (Köppen: Cwa).

References

 Instituto Nacional de Estadística

Populated places in Santa Cruz Department (Bolivia)

it:Camiri